XL Airways France was a French airline with its head offices on the grounds of Paris-Charles de Gaulle Airport. It operated scheduled flights mainly to long-haul destinations in Africa, the Middle East, the United States and the Caribbean as well as charter flights to medium-haul destinations in the Mediterranean, mostly out of Charles de Gaulle Airport. On 19 September 2019, XL Airways announced the suspension of all flights as of 23 September; ticket sales ceased immediately and the company was placed under legal receivership and subsequently wound up. With the closure of the airline, it joined its sister airlines XL Airways UK and XL Airways Germany, both of which were also defunct, with having the XL Airways branding ended.

History

The airline was founded  by Cédric Pastour in August 1995 as Société de Transport Aérien Régional and was trading under Star Europe. In October 1997 it changed its trading name to Star Airlines. On 23 November 2006 the airline changed its name to XL Airways France. On 12 September 2008, parent XL Leisure was about to declare bankruptcy. The airline was then bought by Straumur Investment Bank (later ALMC hf).

On 19 September 2019, XL Airways was placed under legal receivership due to financial difficulties. Ticket sales ceased immediately, and flights were suspended from 23 September. Negotiations with potential buyers had been under way for over a year, and the search for a new buyer continued under the auspices of the commercial court. Only one formal bid was received by the deadline of 4 Octoberfrom Gérard Houa, former minority shareholder of Aigle Azur, who proposed to take over two of XL Airways' four planes and 48% of its 570 staffbut the court deemed that the guarantees were insufficient and ordered the liquidation of the company. In January 2020, the airline's remaining assets were auctioned off; the company's brand names and domain names were sold to an unnamed bidder for €686,400, leaving open the possibility of the name being revived.

Corporate affairs
XL Airways's head office is in the Bâtiment Mars in Continental Square II on the grounds of Charles de Gaulle Airport and in the commune of Tremblay-en-France. The airline's head office was originally in the Immeuble Horizon facility in Noisy-le-Grand, in the Marne-la-Vallée development. Cédric Pastour, the founder of the airline, said that the company chose the Noisy site because the airline did not yet know which airport, Charles de Gaulle Airport or Orly Airport, would serve as the airline's base, and that the Noisy site was equidistant to both airports. Pastour added that the Noisy site had access to the A4 and the A86 autoroutes and was close to the Francilienne, and that the costs in the Noisy area were lower than the costs in the airport area.

Destinations
XL Airways France flew to the following destinations (as of June 2019):

Fleet

Fleet at airline's closing

At the time of closure, the XL Airways France fleet consisted of the following aircraft:

Formerly operated
XL Airways France previously operated the following aircraft types:

Cabin and service
XL Airways France's Airbus A330s were configured entirely with Economy class seating mostly in a 3-3-3 layout, with some rows toward the rear of the aircraft configured in a 2-3-2 layout. A complimentary hot meal was served on all long-haul flights, with an additional breakfast or light meal served depending on flight length. Additional snacks and beverages were available for purchase. Comfort kits consisting of various amenities including a blanket and inflatable neck pillow were also available for purchase.

Inflight entertainment was available both through overhead screens on a running schedule, and on-demand streaming to personal electronic devices via XL Cloud, the airline's wireless streaming entertainment portal. Through XL Cloud, a selection of movies, TV shows, documentaries, and other digital media were available for free, as well as a live inflight map and instant messaging between passengers, however Internet access was not provided through the portal. An extended, premium selection of high definition movies and digital media was available for an all-inclusive fee. In addition, paid rental of virtual reality headsets equipped with noise-cancelling headphones and a selection of movies in 2D and 3D was also available for the duration of the flight.

See also
List of defunct airlines of France

References

External links

Official website
Star Airlines (Archive)

Defunct airlines of France
Airlines established in 1995
Airlines disestablished in 2019
French companies established in 1995
French companies disestablished in 2019